Phildel  is an English singer, pianist, and songwriter from London. Her name is a composite of her Chinese father and Irish mother's names (Philip and Della).

Biography
Phildel's parents divorced and her mother married a religious fundamentalist. Her name, religion, lifestyle, and dress-code were changed by force. All of her personal possessions were seized and music became a forbidden evil within the household. This meant no radio, no CD player, and no piano. She was renamed Zara. For the next decade, Phildel was treated as a servant within her home.

However, Phildel spent lunchtimes with sympathetic music teachers and the school piano, at the girls' day school in Barnet (Queen Elizabeth's School for Girls). The school became a refuge in which she could write and play her own compositions. She eventually ran away from home at age 17 to escape her home-life and follow her dreams.

She soon purchased a second-hand computer and some music demo software packages and began putting together her first home-demo. Within a short while, it attracted the attention of Roger Watson (a former Chrysalis Music MD), and his support of her music led to collaborations with Spike MaClaren at Massive Attack's studio and Sam Dixon (known for his collaborations with many artists including KT Tunstall and Duffy's 'Rockferry' album).

In 2007, she wrote the piano piece "The Kiss" which was used for a worldwide TV advertising campaign for Apple iPad 3. It was also used for Marks & Spencer's advert. Her music has also been used on Persil and Omo washing powder. Another of her tracks "Piano B" was used for an Expedia commercial, followed by two more high-profile filmic campaigns in France in 2008/2009. In 2008, another track, "Everyone's Memory Is Snow" (renamed "A Better World"), was used for the commercial for an insurance company, which Zizou praised.

She said "Four of my tracks have been used in commercials around the world, two of them in the UK. They all came about in different ways, through different individuals, agencies or publishers. But my publisher Warner/Chappell Music have been very proactive in the realm of pitching my music for advertising. I re-invest whatever income I make into top-of-the-range studio equipment and cameras for documenting everything and creating visuals. So, it all goes back into my music."
She was complimented on her "sonic soundscapes" by Trevor Horn.
Her music has been cited as an inspiration by Mariah Huehner, author of the True Blood and Angel comic books.
They have also been used in theatre productions and by celebrity fashion designer Henrietta Ludgate's live shows. She soon returned the favour by wearing Henrietta's dress at a performance at St Pancras Old Church.

During December 2008, Phildel joined the bands Radiohead and Goldfrapp to become a Warner/Chappell Music Publishing artist.

In the summer of 2010, she performed at the Latitude Festival on the Saturday.

She worked at the world-famous Metropolis Recording Studio, to complete her neo-classical album. Called "Qi" Chinese for Energy. This was then followed by the recording of her artist album (for Decca). Her debut album for Decca The Disappearance of the Girl, was released on 4 March 2013.

She appeared on BBC Breakfast show on Thu 21 March 2013, to promote the album.

She was invited on 23 May 2013 by BBC Radio Merseyside's Dave Monks to his 'Introducing' show after a recommendation from Stevo, she performed acoustic renditions of "Storm Song" and "Holes in Your Coffin".

In the summer of 2013, she collaborated with Sleepthief in America, on his new album "Mortal Longing". The two tracks in which she appeared are "Dust & Cloud" and "Where The Heart Is".

She then performed at Vancouver Folk Music Festival on 20 July, as part of her USA and Canada tour.

In Nov, she collaborated with Peter S. Beagle (author of The Last Unicorn) on a new track 'Dark Water Down', mixing poetry and music. They then appeared together at a gig at Cafe Du Nord in San Francisco, USA.

She was interviewed by Gareth Lloyd on BBC Three Counties Radio as part of 'BBC Introducing'.

She currently lives in the Chilterns, where some of her videos are filmed.

On February 4, 2015, a remastered version of her album Qi was released.

Phildel lives in Brighton and was in relationship with artist and musical collaborator Christophe Young, then on August 24, 2016, Phildel gave birth to twin boys Dylan and Finn.

As of 2022, she was in a relationship with music producer and sound designer, David Lawrie.

In May 2019, she released her third album Wave Your Flags after 3 years.

On February 5, 2021, Phildel released an EP called Winterscapes.

Discography

Studio albums

Extended plays

Singles

Collaborations

References

External links
Official website
Phildel's Official Myspace page
Phildel in TITEL kulturmagazin

1983 births
Living people
People from Kensington
English people of Chinese descent
Musicians from London
English women singer-songwriters
Decca Records artists
21st-century English women singers
21st-century English singers